Celina Independent School District is a public school district based in Celina, Texas (USA).

Location
In addition to Celina, the district serves a portion of Weston. Located in Collin County, while a small portion of the district extends into Denton County.

Sport
Celina High School's mascot is the Bobcat and the high school is best known for its dominating football program – it has eight state championships, tied for the most among 11-man programs in Texas (2007, 2005, 2001, 2000, 1999, 1998, 1995, and 1974). The 1974 title was in Class B (now Class A) and was a co-championship with Big Sandy High School (one of the all-time dominant teams) while the 2007 title was in Class AAA; the other six titles were in Class AA.

Celina High School is also home to many other programs; the baseball team has also won a state title (2002 in Class AA).

Music

The Celina High School Band has received eleven consecutive sweepstakes awards and recently won a double state championship in the Outstanding Performance Series (OPS), also earning many other awards in both concert and marching band, including a trip to the UIL State marching competition in 2005.

Ratings
In 2009, the school district was rated "recognized" by the Texas Education Agency.

In 2010, the school district was rated Exemplary.

Schools
Celina High School Grades 9-12
Moore Middle School Grades 6-8
Lykins Elementary School Grades 1-5
O'Dell Elementary School Grades 1-5
Celina Primary School Grades PK-K

References

External links

Celina Elementary
Celina Intermediate
Celina Middle School
Celina High School
Celina Band
Celina Quarterback Club

School districts in Collin County, Texas
School districts in Denton County, Texas